The Revlon Mirror Theater (also known as Mirror Theater) is an American anthology drama television series. The series was broadcast on NBC from June 23 to September 1, 1953, before moving to CBS for the rest of its run from September 19 to December 12, 1953. It aired 23 episodes over its two seasons. The series was sponsored by the Revlon Cosmetics Corporation.

Cast & Crew

The series was presented by, at that time, Revlon spokeswoman Robin Chandler.

The series was directed by Daniel Petrie, Jack Donohue, and Richard Irving and produced by Donald Davis and his wife Dorothy Matthews and Rene Williams.

Guest Stars

Some guest stars of the series include Angela Lansbury, Ronald Reagan, Eva Marie Saint, Agnes Moorehead, Lee Marvin, Eddie Albert, Joanne Dru, and Dorothy Malone.

Production notes

The series aired twenty-three episodes and aired two seasons. The series aired from June 23–December 12, 1953. Season one aired from June 23 to September 1, 1953, on NBC before being cancelled and picked up for a second season by CBS from September 19 until being cancelled mid-season on December 12, 1953.

It was originally broadcast as a Summer replacement on Tuesday nights for The Milton Berle Show. But then the series was picked up as a regular series by CBS.

The series was filmed live in New York City for its NBC run and then filmed and taped in Los Angeles for its CBS run.

Broadcast history

Tuesdays from 8–8:30 PM on NBC from June 23 – September 1, 1953.
Saturdays from 10:30–11 PM on CBS from September 19 – December 12, 1953.

Episodes

The following is the list of episodes that aired:

Season 1

The Little Wife - June 23, 1953
Salt of the Earth - June 30, 1953
Someone Like You - July 7, 1953
Don't Wink at Faint - July 14, 1953
The Enormous Radio - July 21, 1953
A Reputation - July 28, 1953
White Night - August 4, 1953
The Happy Tingle - August 11, 1953
The Party - August 18, 1953 
One Summer's Party - August 25, 1953
The Bottle Party - September 1, 1953

Season 2

Because I Love Him - September 19, 1953
Heads or Tails - September 26, 1953
Lullaby - October 3, 1953
Flight from Home - October 10, 1953
Equal Justice - October 17, 1953
The Surprise Party - October 24, 1953
Dreams Never Lie - October 31, 1953
Award Performance - November 7, 1953
Key in the Lock - November 14, 1953
Summer Dance - November 21, 1953
Uncle Jack - November 28, 1953
Next Stop Bethlehem - December 5, 1953

(Note: The last episode of the series was a repeat of the season 2 premiere which aired on September 19, 1953. The repeat aired on December 12, 1953.)

References

External links

Revlon Mirror Theatre at CVTA with list of episodes

1950s American anthology television series
1953 American television series debuts
1953 American television series endings
American live television series
Black-and-white American television shows
NBC original programming
CBS original programming